The Cottage is a 19th-century plantation complex located near Upper Marlboro in Prince George's County, Maryland. The plantation house has a -story main block constructed in the 1840s with a typical Greek Revival style interior trim and distinctive Italianate cornice brackets. Within  to the northwest of the house is a complex of domestic outbuildings, including a well house, ice house, and meat house. It was the home of Charles Clagett (1819–1894), a prominent member of Upper Marlboro social and political society during the second half of the 19th century. He served as a county commissioner following the Civil War.

It was listed on the National Register of Historic Places in 1989.

References

External links
, including photo in 1987, at Maryland Historical Trust website

Greek Revival houses in Maryland
Italianate architecture in Maryland
Historic American Buildings Survey in Maryland
Houses completed in 1846
Houses in Prince George's County, Maryland
Houses on the National Register of Historic Places in Maryland
Plantation houses in Maryland
National Register of Historic Places in Prince George's County, Maryland
1846 establishments in Maryland